The Singapore national badminton team is a badminton team that represents Singapore in international badminton competitions. The national team is organised by the Singapore Badminton Association (SBA), the top governing body for badminton in the country.

Competitive record

Players

Current squad

Male players
Loh Kean Yew
Terry Hee Yong Kai
Loh Kean Hean
Jason Teh 
Joel Koh
Andy Kwek
Wesley Koh
Junsuke Kubo
Lim Shun Tian

Female players
Yeo Jia Min
Tan Wei Han
Jin Yujia
Crystal Wong
Jaslyn Hooi
Insyirah Khan
Megan Lee Xinyi
Grace Chua
Lim Zhi Rui Bernice

Notes

References

Badminton
National badminton teams
Badminton in Singapore